The San Marcos Mountains are a mountain range in northwestern San Diego County, Southern California.

They are a small range of the Peninsular Ranges System.

Native undeveloped habitats of the San Marcos Mountains are in the California chaparral and woodlands ecoregion.

References 

Peninsular Ranges
Mountain ranges of San Diego County, California